The men's alpine skiing downhill event of the 1956 Winter Olympics at Cortina d'Ampezzo, Italy, was held on Friday, 3 February, at 11:00 a.m.

It was the final alpine event of the games and the third straight victory for Toni Sailer of Austria.

It was the third appearance of the downhill event at the Winter Games, which debuted in 1948. Seventy-five alpine skiers from 27 nations competed.

Results
Friday, 3 February 1956

References

External links
Official Olympic Report
Olympic Results 

1956
Men's alpine skiing at the 1956 Winter Olympics